The R62A is a New York City Subway car model built between 1984 and 1987 by Bombardier Transportation for the A Division. The cars were built in La Pocatière, Quebec, with final assembly done in Auburn, New York and Barre, Vermont, under a license from Kawasaki Heavy Industries, manufacturer of the previous R62 order. A total of 825 cars were built, arranged as sets of three, four, or five cars per set. The cars replaced the remaining R17s, R21s, and R22s, which were all retired by early 1988.

The R62As were a follow-up order to the R62 order from 1981, and the second order of stainless steel cars for the "A" Division. The contract had been given to Bombardier due to Kawasaki's refusal to build the additional cars under a separate order. The first R62As entered service on May 29, 1985, and all were delivered by 1988. The R62As are scheduled to remain in service until 2026–2028, when they will be replaced with the R262s.

Description

The R62As are numbered 1651–2475. Like the R62 order from Kawasaki Heavy Industries, the R62A was made of stainless steel and had air conditioning. A graffiti-resistant glaze was applied to all of the cars because of the extensive graffiti tagging of nearly all of the subway cars in the system since 1971. This reduced the number of seats per car when compared to standard bench seating, but allowed for higher standing capacity.

The cars were originally single cars with functioning half-width cabs at both ends, but were eventually linked into sets with full-width cabs at each end; however, all cars retain intermediate half-width cabs in the remaining cab positions.

Many cars - generally on the 6 - feature LED lights on the sides of the cars around the rollsign where the service logo is indicated to help riders distinguish between an express train (red diamond) and a local train (green circle). These indicators were first introduced on the  when passengers claimed they could not clearly hear the announcements regarding whether the 7 was express or local, even though the "7 Express" sign was used on the front and sides prior to its implementation in 2008. Cars 1736–1740 and 2151 were used as test cars as early as April 12, 2007, and had red LED lettering displaying "LCL" and "EXP" on the front and the side; similar labeling was last seen on the Redbird fleet. When the R188s displaced the R62As from the 7 during the 2010s, the LED lights remained in use since both the 6 and the 7 local services have express variants that run in the peak direction during rush hours.

History
Following the successful delivery of the 325-car R62 order, the New York City Transit Authority (NYCTA) put out a bid for an additional 825 cars. Kawasaki did not want to build the additional cars under a separate contract, so the R62A contract was awarded to Bombardier Transportation of Quebec, who won the bid over Budd Company of Pennsylvania. While Bombardier offered a higher price per car than Budd had, the NYCTA awarded the contract to Bombardier because of the Canadian government's financial plan for the cars. In addition, Budd proposed using unapproved and untested motors, as well as similarly untested technology that frequently broke down on the R44 and R46 fleets.

The 825 cars were built between 1984 and 1987 and entered service between 1985 and 1988, though in August 1985, several cars were frequently taken out of service due to coupler and electrical problems, which almost forced the cancellation of the entire order itself. The first ten R62As, numbered 1651–1660, had their body shells built by Kawasaki Heavy Industries and were shipped to Bombardier for their use as samples during their production. They were placed in service on the  train on May 29, 1985, after arrangements were made to expand the Car Appearance Program to the route (following a successful implementation of the same on the 4 train with the R62s).

Post-delivery

Car 1687 was badly damaged at the Bombardier plant in the summer of 1985, prior to its delivery. However, it was repaired at the end of the order and entered service on December 1, 1987, on the 6.

On November 24, 1996, a ten-car train of R62As on the 6 train derailed south of Hunts Point Avenue. Cars 1716 and 1909 were significantly damaged. Car 1716 was rebuilt and returned to service, but 1909 was retired due to mid-body and frame damage and scrapped in 2001.

Starting in November 2017, as part of an action plan to fix the subway's state of emergency, several cars assigned to the 42nd Street Shuttle had most of their seats removed in order to increase capacity on that service. The other cars assigned to the shuttle also had most of their seats removed as all cars running on said line were linked into six-car sets.

Replacement 
The cars were initially expected to be replaced starting in 2026 and lasting into 2028. The MTA has been maintaining the R62As through the SMS program, which consists of repainting bulkheads, rebuilding trucks, changing out floors, repainting damaged seats, and other minor interior work on a set schedule in order to extend useful service life. In 2010, the MTA proposed mid-life technological upgrades for the R62As, including LED destination signs and automated announcements.

In January 2019, the MTA announced that it would be replacing the R62/A fleets with the R262s, a new fleet that would be ordered as part of a future capital program.

In popular culture
An R62A is featured in Inside Llewyn Davis, but however, the train is historically inaccurate.

References

Further reading
 Sansone, Gene. Evolution of New York City subways: An illustrated history of New York City's transit cars, 1867-1997. New York Transit Museum Press, New York, 1997

External links

nycsubway.org - NYC Subway Cars: R62/R62A

Train-related introductions in 1985
New York City Subway rolling stock
Bombardier Transportation multiple units